Thomas Southwell, 2nd Baron Southwell PC (Ire), FRS (7 January 1698 – 19 November 1766), styled The Honourable from 1717 until 1720, was an Irish peer, politician and freemason.

Background
He was the oldest son of Thomas Southwell, 1st Baron Southwell and his wife Lady Meliora Coningsby, eldest daughter of Thomas Coningsby, 1st Earl Coningsby. His uncles were William Southwell and Richard Southwell, his younger brother was Henry Southwell. In 1743, Southwell became Grand Master of the Grand Lodge of Ireland, a position he held until the following year.

Career
In 1717, Southwell entered the Irish House of Commons for Limerick County, the same constituency his father had represented before, and sat for it until 1720, when he succeeded him also as baron. In 1726, Southwell was sworn of the Privy Council of Ireland. He became a Fellow of the Royal Society in 1735 and was Governor of County Limerick until his resignation in 1762.

Family
In March 1719, he married Mary Coke, eldest daughter of Thomas Coke, and by her he had three sons. Southwell died at Craig's Court, Charing Cross, aged 68 and was succeeded in his titles by his eldest surviving son Thomas. His younger brother, Edmund Southwell, "lived in intimacy with" Samuel Johnson for many years, and was the first to introduce the great Shakespearean scholar Edmond Malone to him.

References

Notes

Sources

1698 births
1766 deaths
Barons in the Peerage of Ireland
Fellows of the Royal Society
Irish MPs 1715–1727
Politicians from County Limerick
Members of the Parliament of Ireland (pre-1801) for County Limerick constituencies
Members of the Privy Council of Ireland
Mayors of Limerick (city)